Erechthias psammaula, the brown-stripe moth, is a moth of the  family Tineidae. It is found on Fiji, French Polynesia, Tonga and the Cook Islands.

The larvae feed on the leaves of Cocos nucifera.

References

Erechthiinae
Moths described in 1921